"Prokofiev" was a single by the Damned, released in November 1991 on the Skinnies Cut label.

The song was recorded in June 1990 in Rat Scabies' home studio, consisting of a loop of the Stooges' song "Gimme Danger", over which Brian James improvised guitar and sound effects. At a later point, vocals by Dave Vanian were added.

The single was sold on the Damned's September 1991 reunion tour of the US and came without a picture sleeve. It was later remixed for Not of This Earth in 1996.

Track listing
 "Prokofiev" (Rat Scabies, Brian James)
 "Prokofiev (Instrumental)" (Scabies, James)

Production credits
 Producer:
 Rat Scabies
 Musicians:
 Dave Vanian − vocals
 Brian James − guitar, sound effects

1991 singles
The Damned (band) songs
Songs written by Rat Scabies
Songs written by Brian James (guitarist)
British rock songs
1991 songs